Cylindrepomus fouqueti is a species of beetle in the family Cerambycidae. It was described by Pic in 1932, originally under the genus Olenecamptus.

References

Dorcaschematini
Beetles described in 1932